The Rachel Jackson State Office Building, also known as the Rachel Jackson Building, is an eight-story building in Nashville, Tennessee, U.S. It was built on the site of the 1925 Cotton States Building, and completed in 1985. It was designed in the modernist style by Taylor & Crabtree.  

The building was named for First Lady-designate Rachel Jackson. When it was completed in 1985, it was "the first state-owned building in the [state] capital to memorialize a woman." It is located next to the Andrew Jackson State Office Building, named for former President Andrew Jackson.

Initial tenants in 1985 included the Tennessee Arts Commission, the Tennessee Department of Economic and Community Development, the Tennessee Department of Tourist Development, the Tennessee Department of Correction, and the Tennessee Board of Parole.

References

Office buildings completed in 1985
Office buildings in Nashville, Tennessee
Andrew Jackson family